Anastasia Myskina was the two-time defending champion, but lost in the quarterfinals to Elena Dementieva in a rematch of the previous year's final.

Mary Pierce won the title, defeating Francesca Schiavone in the final 6–4, 6–3. This would be Pierce's final WTA title of her career; she hasn't played on the tour since 2006.

Seeds
A champion seed is indicated in bold text while text in italics indicates the round in which that seed was eliminated. The top four seeds received a bye to the second round.

Draw

Finals

Top half

Bottom half

External links
 Kremlin Cup Draw

Kremlin Cup
Kremlin Cup